Funmi Falana is a Nigerian legal practitioner and women's rights activist.

Personal life and education 
Funmi Falana is the wife of Femi Falana, a Nigerian activist and lawyer; and mother to Falz, a Nigerian recording artist and actor. she attended St. Louis Girls’ Grammar School, Akure, Ondo State. She obtained her bachelor's degree in physics from the University of Benin, and later bagged her law degree (LL.B) at the University of Lagos. Fummi later obtained her master's degree (LL.M) from the University of Lagos as well.

Career 
Funmi Falana currently serves as the National Director of Women Empowerment and Legal Aid (WELA), a non-governmental organization that defends the right of women and children. She belongs to some professional and leadership association within and outside Nigeria. she is member Nigerian Bar Association, West African Bar Association and International Bar Association, Member, The Chartered Institute of Arbitrators.

Leadership and activism 
Funmi Falana in her capacity as the current National Director of Women Empowerment and Legal Aid (WELA), a  non-governmental organization actively participates in activism. she has led some campaigns against rape, women marginalisation and participation in politics, gender based, policy and decision-making. Through her organisation, she challenged Regulation 124 of the Police Act which prohibited female officers from getting married until after three years of service, and the court declared the provision was unconstitutional and discriminatory against women, so it was null and void,

In a letter dated January 28, 2021 and titled “Request To Recall Dismissed Pregnant Police Officer”, Fumi as the Chairperson of WELA  asked the Inspector General of Police (IGP) Ibrahim Adamu, to reinstate Corporal Olajide Omotola of the Ekiti State Police Command who was dismissed for getting pregnant out of wedlock. She said she would challenge the dismissal of Mrs. Omotola at the National Industrial Court of Nigeria (NICN) and pray for the annulment of Regulation 127 made pursuant to the Police Act, 2020 if the police authority fails to reinstate her within a reasonable time.

References

Year of birth missing (living people)
Living people
Nigerian women lawyers
Nigerian activists
Nigerian women's rights activists
Nigerian women activists
University of Lagos alumni
University of Benin (Nigeria) alumni
Falana family